A Deeper Kind of Slumber is the fifth studio album from Swedish band Tiamat. Featuring female background vocals by Birgit Zacher (Moonspell, Angel Dust) and experimentation with a variety of influences, the album marked the group's first complete withdrawal from both death metal and conventional heavy metal, following their 1994 release, Wildhoney. It was also the first production after their relocation to Germany, and was written almost entirely by founder/lead songwriter Johan Edlund. Much of the music had reflected on Edlund's personal relationship with drugs, creative differences within the band as well as an interpersonal relationship.

Track listing

Credits

Tiamat
Johan Edlund – vocals, rhythm guitar, keyboards, theremin, co-production
Thomas Petersson – electric and acoustic guitars
Anders Iwers – bass guitar
Lars Sköld – drums

Additional personnel
The Inchtabokatables – violin, cello 
Sami Yli-Sirniö – sitar
Ertugrul Coruk – flute
Anke Eilhardt – Oboe
Birgit Zacher – additional vocals
Dirk Draeger – keyboards, engineering, production
Siggi Bemm – engineering, mixing, mastering

Charts

References

1997 albums
Tiamat (band) albums
Symphonic rock albums